The Suzuki GF 250 was a water-cooled four-cylinder four-stroke road motorbike. The engine block and transmission were the same as the GSX-R250. It did not rev as high (13000 redline) as the GSX-R series, but had several finer points like adjustable dampening on the suspension. It has 2pot brakes on the front and single on the rear. It was produced in the late 1980s and early 1990s. Top speed was about 180 km/h. There were one- and two-seat versions.

References 

GF250